James S. Fishkin (born 1948) holds the Janet M. Peck Chair in International Communication in the Department of Communication at Stanford University, where he is professor of communication and (by courtesy) professor of political science. He is also director of Stanford’s Center for Deliberative Democracy. Fishkin is a widely cited scholar on his work on deliberative democracy. As a way of applying this concept he proposed Deliberative Polling in 1988. Along with Robert Luskin (no connection to Karl Rove's attorney of the same name), he has collaborated on applications of Deliberative Polling in 21 countries.

Career
Fishkin received his BA degree and Ph.D. in political science from Yale University. He then studied at King's College,  Cambridge University, where he took a second Ph.D in philosophy. He is the current director of Stanford's Center for Deliberative Democracy. He has been a Guggenheim fellow, a fellow of the Center for Advanced Study in the Behavioral Sciences at Stanford, a fellow of the Woodrow Wilson International Center for Scholars and a visiting fellow commoner at Trinity College, Cambridge. In 2014 he was elected to the American Academy of Arts and Sciences.

Deliberative Poll
The deliberative opinion poll takes a representative random sample of the people and brings the people together at a place to deliberate about an issue. The people are provided briefing materials which are made in concert with all interested parties and done in a way so as to represent each position in a balanced way. The people are asked to register their considered opinions after a day or more of deliberation. Taken as a vote, the decisions made by such arrangements have been alternatively used to elect candidates in primaries (Greece) or recommend policy decisions (China, Texas) etc. It was the basis of the "Power and the People", a Channel 4 program on which Fishkin was a consultant that aired in the UK (1994–1999).

More than 70 such deliberative polls have taken place around the world, including: Argentina, Canada, Brazil, the United States, Ghana, Tanzania, Uganda, China, Hong Kong, Japan, Korea, Bulgaria, Denmark, Greece, Hungary, Italy, Northern Ireland, Poland, Croatia, the United Kingdom, the European Union, and Australia

References

Further reading
Books

Deliberative democracy

 Democracy and Deliberation: New Directions for Democratic Reform (New Haven and London: Yale University Press, 1991; paperback edition, 1993).
 Philosophy, Politics and Society, Sixth Series: Justice Between Age Groups and Generations [co-edited with Peter Laslett], (New Haven and London: Yale University Press, 1992).
 The Dialogue of Justice: Toward a Self-Reflective Society (New Haven and London: Yale University Press, 1992; paperback edition, 1996).
 The Voice of the People: Public Opinion and Democracy (New Haven and London: Yale University Press, 1995; expanded paperback edition, Fall 1997).
 Debating Deliberative Democracy (with Peter Laslett) (Oxford: Blackwell, 2003).
 Deliberation Day (New Haven and London: Yale University Press, 2004). (with Bruce Ackerman)
 When the People Speak: Deliberative Democracy and Public Consultation (Oxford: Oxford University Press, 2009). Paperback edition, 2010. Japanese edition, 2010; Chinese edition, in press.

Political theory and philosophy

 Tyranny and Legitimacy: A Critique of Political Theories  (The Johns Hopkins University Press, 1979)
 Beyond Subjective Morality: Ethical Reasoning and Political Philosophy  (Yale University Press, 1986)
 Limits of Obligation (Yale University Press, 1982)
 Justice, Equal Opportunity and the Family (Yale University Press,1984)
 Population and Political Theory (PPAS - Philosophy, Politics & Society) [co-edited with Robert E. Goodin] (Oxford: Wiley-Blackwell, 2010)

Journal papers

 
 
 Fishkin, James S.; List, Christian; McLean, Iain; Luskin, Robert (2002). Can deliberation induce greater preference structuration: evidence from deliberative opinion polls? Paper presented at the meeting of the American Political Science Association, Boston, 26 August – 1 September.

External links
Center for Deliberative Democracy
Boston Review article by Fishkin - Nation in a room bostonreview.net 
article on Deliberation Day coauthored with Bruce Ackerman   American Prospect 
 Luca Corchia,  Il sondaggio deliberativo di James S. Fishkin, in «Il Trimestrale del Laboratorio. The Lab's Quarterly», Pisa, Dipartimento di Scienze Sociali, 1, 2007, ss. 20
 Luca Fezzi, La corda rossa: la democrazia ateniese e il Deliberative Polling di James S. Fishkin COMUNICAZIONE POLITICA, 2008, 12 pp. p49-60

Living people
1948 births
Stanford University Department of Communication faculty
Yale University alumni